Lady Anne Mary Gabrielle Lambton (born 4 July 1954) is a British actress.

Lambton is a younger daughter of Antony Lambton (formerly 6th Earl of Durham) and his wife Bindy née Blew-Jones. Her older sister is Lucinda Lambton, the British writer, photographer and broadcaster. One of her first roles was as Linda in Sid and Nancy (1986) and then as a witch in the 1990 film, The Witches. Lambton's recent appearances include Brothers of the Head and Mrs. Henderson Presents (both 2005) and The Edge of Love (2008) as well as the reporter Gloria in Netflix’s second season of The Crown.

External links
 
 Burke's Peerage & Gentry, 107th edition.

1954 births
English film actresses
English television actresses
Daughters of British earls
Anne Lambton
Living people